Amnesia: The Dark Descent is a survival horror adventure video game by Frictional Games, released in 2010 for Microsoft Windows, Mac OS X and Linux operating systems, in 2016 for the PlayStation 4 platform and in 2018 for the Xbox One. The game features a protagonist named Daniel exploring a dark and foreboding castle called Brennenburg, while trying to maintain his sanity by avoiding monsters and unsettling events. The game was critically well-received, earning two awards from the Independent Games Festival and numerous positive reviews.

Originally released independently via online distribution, the game has since been published in retail by 1C Company in Russia and Eastern Europe, as well as THQ in North America. A collection of five short stories set in the world of Amnesia, written by Mikael Hedberg and illustrated by the game's concept artists, was also made available. In addition, the game's soundtrack is available for purchase and a free content expansion Justine has been released, as well as many fan-made expansions and stories for its unique "Custom Story" game mode.

An indirect sequel to The Dark Descent, titled Amnesia: A Machine for Pigs, was released on 10 September 2013. The Amnesia Collection – which contains The Dark Descent, its Amnesia: Justine expansion and A Machine for Pigs was released for PlayStation 4 on 22 November 2016, and for Xbox One on 28 September 2018. The same collection was released on the Nintendo Switch on 12 September 2019. A second sequel, developed by Frictional Games, Amnesia: Rebirth, was announced on 6 March 2020, and was released on 20 October 2020.

Gameplay

Amnesia: The Dark Descent is a first-person adventure game with survival horror elements. The player takes control of Daniel, who must navigate Castle Brennenburg  while avoiding various dangers and solving puzzles. The gameplay retains the physical object interaction used in the Penumbra series, allowing for physics-based puzzles and interactions such as opening doors and fixing machinery. Smaller items can be stored in an inventory menu, while larger objects can be raised by holding down a mouse button and pushing or pulling the mouse. Objects such as doors or levers can be manipulated by using the mouse in a fashion that imitates moving the said object. The game's difficulty level can be adjusted preceding its initiation, but cannot be readjusted once the game has begun.

In addition to a health indicator, Daniel's sanity must be managed, centered around an "afraid of darkness" mechanic. According to designer Thomas Grip, "the idea was basically that the darkness itself should be an enemy." Sanity is reduced by staying in the dark for too long, witnessing unsettling events or looking directly at monsters. Low sanity causes visual and auditory hallucinations and an increased chance of attracting monsters, while its complete depletion results in a temporary drop in mobility, or death in higher difficulties. Light sources help restore sanity, and if none are available, Daniel may use tinderboxes to ignite candles and torches or deploy an oil-burning lantern. However, the number of tinderboxes and the amount of oil available are both limited, even more so in higher difficulties.

If a monster sees Daniel, it will chase him until he evades its sight. Daniel has no means of fighting monsters, so he must either avoid being seen or run away. Daniel can withstand only a few attacks from a monster before he dies, which will cause the most recent save of the game to load. The player can restore Daniel's health by using laudanum found throughout the game. The player can hinder monsters by closing doors and building barricades from nearby objects. However, monsters can destroy doors and knock over objects. Hiding in dark areas where monsters will not notice Daniel is also effective, but will decrease Daniel's sanity. In higher difficulties, the monsters will move faster, deal more damage and search for Daniel for longer periods of time.

Plot
On 19 August 1839, a young man awakens in the dark and empty halls of the Prussian Brennenburg Castle with no memory about himself or his past. All he can remember is that his name is Daniel, that he lives in Mayfair, and that something or someone is hunting him. Shortly after regaining consciousness, Daniel finds a note he wrote to himself, which informs him that he has deliberately erased his own memory and is being hunted by a "Shadow", an unearthly presence that manifests itself through fleshy, acidic growths spreading throughout the castle. The note instructs Daniel to descend into the Inner Sanctum of the castle in order to find and kill its baron, Alexander.

As he makes his way through the castle, Daniel gradually learns both about its mysteries and about his own past, through notes and diaries he finds as well as through sudden flashbacks and visions. The origin of his situation is a mysterious orb that he recovered from the Tin Hinan Tomb, which unleashed the Shadow. Each of the experts he contacted and consulted in person about the orb was later found gruesomely dismembered. Realizing that the Shadow was slowly stalking him, Daniel desperately exhausted all archaeological leads into strange orbs until contacted by Alexander, who promised a means of repelling the threat of the Shadow via a "vitae" energy, which could only be harvested from living creatures via extreme pain and terror. However, Alexander's true purpose is to use Daniel's vitae-enriched orb to return to his native dimension, from which he was banished centuries prior. To achieve this end, Alexander and Daniel gathered vitae by torturing innocent people that Alexander claimed to be murderous criminals.

To maximize the production of vitae, the victims were forced to consume a potion that induced amnesia, so that they could never grow accustomed to their torment. Unbeknownst to Daniel, application of vitae to the orb further enraged the Shadow in addition to briefly repelling it, sealing his eventual doom. Increasingly desperate to escape the Shadow, Daniel became sadistic in his attempts to harvest vitae, and accidentally killed an escaping prisoner, a young girl, in a fit of rage. Following the final ritual, Alexander sensed Daniel's guilt and declining faith in him and left him for dead as a result. Realizing how Alexander had manipulated him, Daniel swore revenge and swallowed an amnesia potion in order to overcome his paralyzing guilt.

As Daniel nears the Inner Sanctum, he encounters Heinrich Cornelius Agrippa, a man who had once studied the orbs with his student Johann Weyer and has since been kept alive and imprisoned by Alexander. He tells Daniel that Weyer has been able to harness the power of the orbs to travel between dimensions, and instructs him in finding the pieces of what used to be his own orb, which is needed to breach the Inner Sanctum. Agrippa also asks Daniel to take with him his head, which can be severed alive using a tonic invented by Weyer, and throw it into the inter-dimensional portal after Alexander opens it. Once Daniel enters the Inner Sanctum, there are three possible endings: he can let Alexander succeed, then be killed by the Shadow and descend into darkness, while Alexander tells him his sacrifice will be forever celebrated; he can prevent the portal from opening by knocking over its support columns, then leave the castle content with his redemption after the Shadow kills only Alexander; or he can throw Agrippa's head into the portal, which leaves the Shadow to kill both Alexander and Daniel, though Agrippa promises to save Daniel from descending into darkness, calling upon Weyer to help him.

Amnesia: Justine
The player takes control of an unnamed woman, who awakens with amnesia in a dungeon cell. A phonograph in the cell contains a recording by a woman named Justine, who tells the unnamed woman that she is the subject of a psychological test. The woman must overcome three puzzles to escape the dungeon. In each, she has the option of simply abandoning the puzzle and walking away, but doing so will cause an innocent victim to die. She is also pursued by the Suitors, three monstrous characters who turn out to be Justine's former paramours, now twisted by physical and psychological torture. After surviving the puzzle sections, the woman discovers a phonograph dangling from the ceiling, which causes the walls of the chamber to close in and threaten to crush the woman. She passes out, but awakens unharmed and begins to congratulate herself. The woman is Justine, who staged the entire experiment to see if she still had any compassion for humanity within herself. The ending sequence's dialogue differs depending on the number of people Justine had rescued.

Development
Work began on the game while Penumbra: Requiem was still being developed, with the company working on both projects at the same time. The game was first known under two working titles: Unknown and Lux Tenebras. It was not until 3 November 2009 that it was announced as its current title, Amnesia, and 13 November with the release of the game's website and a game trailer. Initial designs of the game varied considerably from the final game, with the developers interested in reintroducing more combat elements similar to those utilized in their first commercial title Penumbra: Overture. The developers soon discovered that they encountered many of the same problems and difficulties that plagued the combat in that game however, and the design was further changed to be more similar to the style set out by Overtures sequel Penumbra: Black Plague.

On 5 February 2010, it was announced that the game had reached the alpha stage of development on all platforms. Two weeks later the developers released a new teaser trailer that showed actual gameplay footage, and the developers began accepting pre-orders for the game through their website. Also revealed was that the game was at that point being tested on all three intended platforms. It was also announced that the game would be released simultaneously for all of them in August 2010. This was later rescheduled, and the game was then expected to have an 8 September 2010 release. It was then later announced on 27 August 2010 that the game had officially gone Gold and would soon be ready for sale. On 3 September, the game's demo was released containing selected parts of the gameplay and story. It was then successfully released on 8 September 2010.

If the game reached 2000 pre-orders by 31 May 2010, Frictional promised it would release extra content for the game. The goal was finally met in early May, after the pre-orders were offered at a discount made available until 31 May. This was done due to the success of Penumbra: Overture as a part of the first Humble Indie Bundle. The extra content was revealed to be commentary, and they explained in the comments section of the same page that its intended function was similar to that of Valve's commentary system that began in the Half-Life 2 series. The authors cite "Soul Made Flesh" by Carl Zimmer and older horror movies such as The Haunting as being inspirations for the mood and style of the game. Other critics have drawn parallels between the game's story and the writings of H. P. Lovecraft.

Thomas Grip, one of the game's main developers, would later write up a post-mortem of the game titled "The Terrifying Tale of Amnesia" for The Escapist, where he outlined in detail the process of the game's development, mostly focusing on its ever-changing design and the financial problems that plagued the developers for most of the game's development.

A PlayStation 4 version – Amnesia Collection – was released on 22 November 2016 via PlayStation Network; this title includes The Dark Descent, its expansion Amnesia: Justine, and the sequel Amnesia: A Machine for Pigs.

Just two days after its release on PS4, Frictional Games posted a tweet stating that the port managed to recoup all costs and "more".

On 23 September 2020, it was announced that Amnesia: The Dark Descent would be made open source.

Audio

The game's music was composed by Mikko Tarmia and released for download on 17 May 2011. Some unused music can be heard in the soundtrack, but not in-game.

Downloadable content
On 12 April 2011, Frictional Games released an extra free level for owners of the Steam version of Amnesia. This additional campaign is set apart from Brennenburg Castle. Justine was released on Steam as a way to promote the then-upcoming release of Portal 2, as getting 100% on the campaign (all of the collectables, all of the analysis and making correct choices) unlocks a message from the fictional company Aperture Science. The content was made available for all of the game's supported platforms and versions as part of the Amnesia v1.2 update on 17 May 2011.

It is possible to create custom stories for Amnesia that can then be loaded in the game. Various tools for the HPL Engine 2 have been released that allow the creation of unique levels, models, particle effects and materials, using an interface similar to Valve's Hammer Editing Software. Game logic can be implemented using the AngelScript scripting language. A prominent example of a custom story is Penumbra: Necrologue, a fan-made sequel to Frictional's earlier Penumbra series.

On 23 September 2020, Frictional Games announced that they would be releasing the source code for both Amnesia: The Dark Descent and Amnesia: A Machine For Pigs. Both games are available as open-source video games under GNU GPL-3.0-or-later.

Reception

Amnesia: The Dark Descent has received very positive reviews from critics, with consistent praise given for the ominous atmosphere and horror elements: "By strongly focusing on vision and hearing, the distance between player and game is radically diminished. This is technically reinforced by the game's minimal handling." John Walker of Rock, Paper, Shotgun even went as far as to say that "I think it is safe to say that Amnesia is the most successfully frightening game to have been made." X-Play added Amnesia to its top ten PC games saying "There are a lot of so-called "horror" games out there, this one is no joke. You'll be rocking back and forth and crying in no time".

Frictional Games did show some trepidation over the game's initial sales after the first week, but were encouraged by continued sales throughout the first month after the game's release, with Frictional recouping all the expenses from creating Amnesia by early October 2010. By the beginning of January 2011 the developer reported that nearly 200,000 units had been sold, declaring in response that "With these figures at hand, we must confess that it gives us new confidence for the PC." The game kept gaining sales and in July 2011 it had sold almost 350,000 units. At the 2011 Independent Games Festival Amnesia won awards for both "Excellence in Audio" and "Technical Excellence" along with the "Direct2Drive Vision Award" which included a $10,000 prize.

A year after the original release of Amnesia, the developers revealed that they had sold around 391,102 units and were continuing to sell about 6,000 units per month. They also released details about how much money each platform generated for them by analyzing the sales from their online store, with 70% of sales coming from Windows users and 15% coming from users of Linux and another 15% coming from users of Mac OS X. Frictional did however note that their store was the only place anyone could purchase the Linux version of the game, whereas the Mac OS X and Windows versions could be purchased from other sources, meaning that the total percentage of Linux sales is actually considerably smaller compared to other platforms taken collectively. Observing that their own Mac OS X sales did not go down from their own store even as services like Steam picked up the game for that platform, meaning that it did not steal customers from their store but instead opened up a new market, they decided this makes a good incentive for other stores to support Linux as well. As of September 2012, the game sits at an estimated 1.4 million sales.

In 2011, Adventure Gamers named Amnesia the 34th-best adventure game ever released. In 2015, Kotaku originally ranked Amnesia as the 2nd best horror game of all time, beaten only by P.T., but moved it to 1st after P.T. was removed by Konami. In 2017, GamesRadar+ ranked Amnesia as the 3rd best horror game of all time, although in a revised list in 2018, moved the game down to 13th place. In 2018, The A.V. Club ranked Amnesia as the 7th greatest horror game of all time in a list of 35.

Sequels

An indirect sequel called Amnesia: A Machine for Pigs was released on 10 September 2013, developed by The Chinese Room and published by Frictional Games. A Machine for Pigs is an indirect sequel to The Dark Descent which, while set in the same universe, takes place in an alternative history with different characters.

The third game in the series, titled Amnesia: Rebirth was announced on 6 March 2020. Rebirth, the second Amnesia game to be developed by Frictional Games. A gameplay reveal trailer was uploaded on 2 October 2020 to a positive reception. The game was released on 20 October 2020 for PlayStation 4, Linux and Windows.

On December 1st, 2022. The fourth game in the series, titled Amnesia: The Bunker was announced and is set to release on 16 May 2023. The Bunker, is the third Amnesia game to be made by Frictional Games. The game features combat in a semi-open world, a first for the series.

References

External links
 
 
 

2010 video games
2010s horror video games
First-person adventure games
Gothic video games
Indie video games
Linux games
MacOS games
Psychological horror games
Survival horror video games
PlayStation 4 games
PlayStation 4 Pro enhanced games
PlayStation Network games
Software that uses FLTK
Software using the GPL license
THQ games
Video games about amnesia
Video game franchises introduced in 2010
Video games developed in Sweden
Video games featuring female protagonists
Video games set in castles
Video games set in Germany
Video games set in the 19th century
Video games with commentaries
Windows games
Xbox One games
Single-player video games
Open-source video games
Nintendo Switch games
Video games scored by Mikko Tarmia
Independent Games Festival winners
1C Company games